Clarence "Scally" Smith was a baseball player in the Negro leagues. He would play infielder and outfielder and played from 1921 to 1933. Smith also managed the Birmingham Black Barons from 1929 to 1930.

References

External links
 and Baseball-Reference Black Baseball stats and Seamheads
  and Seamheads
Negro League Baseball Museum

Columbus Buckeyes players
Baltimore Black Sox players
Birmingham Black Barons players
Cleveland Cubs players
Detroit Stars players
Indianapolis ABCs (1931–1933) players
Chicago American Giants players
Bacharach Giants players
Negro league baseball managers
Year of birth missing
Year of death missing
Baseball outfielders
Baseball infielders